The Miss Perú 1999 pageant was held on April 16, 1999. That year, 23 candidates were competing for the national crown. The chosen winner represented Peru at the Miss Universe 1999. The rest of the finalists would enter in different pageants.

Placements

Special Awards
 Best Regional Costume - Amazonas – Ana María Pareja
 Miss Photogenic - Lambayeque – Karolina Mimbela
 Miss Elegance - Ucayali – Sandra Meza
 Miss Body - Tumbes – Thalía Estabridis
 Best Hair - Tacna – Malu Costa
 Miss Congeniality - Puno – Silvana Pimentel
 Most Beautiful Face - Madre de Dios – Elba Miasta

Delegates

 Amazonas – Ana María Pareja
 Áncash – Katiuska Romero
 Apurímac – Rocío Mejía
 Arequipa – Paola de la Jara
 Ayacucho – Karla Farias
 Callao – Daniela Aspe
 Cuzco – Romina Robinson
 Distrito Capital – Fabiola Lazo
 Huancavelica – Leslie Montoya
 Huánuco – Elsa Guerra
 Ica – Karen Meza
 Junín – Mayte Duenas

 La Libertad – Raquel Pérez Quevedo
 Lambayeque – Karolina Mimbela
 Loreto – Vanessa Gamboa
 Madre de Dios – Elba Miasta
 Pasco – Larissa Velazco
 Piura – Carolina Brandon
 Puno – Silvana Pimentel
 San Martín – Llubitza Banic
 Tacna – Malu Costa
 Tumbes – Thalía Estabridis
 Ucayali – Sandra Meza

Judges
 Ana Colchero - Soap Opera Actress
 Gian Marco Zignago - Peruvian Singer & Songwriter
 Laura Bozzo - Peruvian Talk show Hostess
 Dr.Frank Zegarra - Plastic Surgeon
 Acirema Alayeto - President of the Miss Latin America Org.
 Eleazar Molina - Jewel Designer
 Beto Ortiz - Peruvian Journalist & Writer
 Sonia Oquendo - Peruvian Actress
 Luis Uzcategui - Fashion Designer
 Claudia Dopf Scansi - Miss Peru 1997

References

Miss Peru
1999 in Peru
1999 beauty pageants